Taylor's Wailers is the debut album by drummer Art Taylor, released in 1957 on Prestige. It features tracks recorded mainly on February 25, 1957 plus a track from a different session featuring John Coltrane on saxophone.

Track listing 
"Batland" (Lee Sears)9:52
"C.T.A." (Jimmy Heath)4:43
"Exhibit A" (Sears)6:16
"Cubano Chant" (Bryant)6:36
"Off Minor" (Monk)5:38
"Well You Needn't" (Monk)7:55

Personnel
Tracks 1, 3–6
Art Taylordrums
Donald Byrdtrumpet
Jackie McLeanalto sax
Charlie Rousetenor sax
Ray Bryantpiano
Wendell Marshallbass

Track 2
Art Taylordrums
John Coltranetenor sax
Red Garlandpiano
Paul Chambersbass

References 

1957 albums
Albums produced by Bob Weinstock
Prestige Records albums